Monción is one of the 3 municipalities of the province in Santiago Rodriguez, Dominican Republic.

Previously it was called Guaraguanó, a name from the Taíno, but in 1898, the President of the Republic at that time, Ulises Heureaux, assigned the name of Monción, in honor of the hero of the Dominican Restoration War, General Benito Monción. In 1907, Monción became the official municipality of the Monte Cristi Province. Then in 1948, when the Province of Santiago Rodríguez was created, it became its municipality. It is located specifically in the southwest part of the province.

Its main economic source is the production of Cassava, being this municipality, the largest producer of this product in the country, for this reason it is known as the capital of Cassava.

Limits 
South: Cordillera Central, Dominican Republic

North: Mao, Dominican Republic

East: San José de las Matas

West: Sabaneta, Dominican Republic

Climate 

Monción has a tropical savanna climate (Köppen climate classification: Aw) with a dry season on winter and an pronounced wet season on summer.

Municipal districts 

 Gurabo
 Cepillo
 Gurabito
 Cañada Grande
 Meseta
 Barrio Nuevo
 Mata del Dajao
 Jicomé
 Cacique
 Los Pinos
 Mamoncito
 Veladero
 Bulla
 Clavijo
 Durán
 El Rodeo
 Loma del Tanque

Geography

Relief 
The municipality of Monción is located at the foot of the Cordillera Central (Hispaniola), surrounded by mountainous areas and beautiful natural landscapes that embellish the environment.

To the south of the municipality is the José Armando Bermúdez National Park, the most important forest reserve in the region. To the east is the Piky Lora National Park.

Hidrology 

The main river that crosses Monción is the Rio Mao, which flows into the Monción Dam in the southern part of the municipality.

Monción Dam 
It was inaugurated on September 22, 2001 by President Hipólito Mejía. It is the highest dam in the Dominican Republic.

In 2003, won the El Puente Alcántara International Prize.

The purposes of this are the production of electrical energy, consumption of drinking water, tourism and services for agricultural production in the region.

Demography 
For the year 2010, the population was 11,753 inhabitants.

Economy 
The main source of economic is the production and export of Cassava. It has more than 50 factories for this product, which makes it the main economic activity. Also the manufacture of Cabinetmaking products and international remittances, due to the large number of moncioneros residing in the United States.

In this municipality is the main office of the Cooperativa Mamoncito, one of the main savings and credit cooperatives in the country, founded on April 2, 1978 and which has more than 8 offices nationwide.

Art and culture

Festivities 
Since 1912, the patronal feasts in honor of San Antonio de Padua in June.

In 1913, the Dominican musician Ñico Lora composed the merengue San Antonio, in honor of Anthony of Padua and the moncionero people. Since then, it has been declared as the anthem of this municipality. The festivities begin with the celebration of Holy Mass in the church and then live music where the main orchestras of the country and also local musicians and talents participate.

June 13 is for municipal rejoicing and a large part of the population gathers in the central park to celebrate this important day in the municipality.

Festivities

Since 1912, the patron saint festivities in honor of San Antonio de Padua have been held in June.

In 1913, the Dominican musician Ñico Lora composed the merengue San Antonio, in honor of San Antonio de Padua and the moncionero people. Since then, it has been declared as the anthem of this municipality. The festivities begin with the celebration of Holy Mass in the Parish and then live music where the main orchestras of the country and also local musicians and talents participate.

On June 12 there is a parade from the community of Cepillo to the municipal park.

June 13 is for municipal rejoicing and a large part of the population gathers in the central park to celebrate this important day in the municipality.

Carnival 
For the beginning of March, the moncionero carnival celebration takes place for three days.

Field day 
In September, the field day is held at the Minor Seminary of Our Lady of Mercedes, owned by the Catholic Church, where hundreds of people gather for the celebration of Mercedes Day.

Tourism 
The main tourist attraction is the Monción Dam, in the southern part of the Municipality.

Education

Schools 

 Juan Pablo Duarte High School
 La Trinitaria School
 Professor Juan Bosch School
 Anastacio Valle School
 San Antonio Labor School
 Juan Francisco Lora Music School
 Cañada Grande School
 Yisel Arias Secondary School
 La Meseta School
 English by immersion

Health centers 

 Monción Municipal Hospital
 Dr. Morel Clinic
 Dental health

References 

Populated places in Santiago Rodríguez Province
Municipalities of the Dominican Republic